The Krivolak Military Training Center is a regional military training center of the Macedonian army, located near the town of Negotino in central North Macedonia. Its surface is 22.546 hectares and is known as one of the biggest military centers in Southeast Europe. It was officially opened in 1970 and was used by the Yugoslav People's Army.

References

Official website 
ARMY OF THE REPUBLIC OF NORTH MACEDONIA

External links

Military locations of North Macedonia
Military training facilities
Yugoslav People's Army